Lake Vernon may mean:

Lake Vernon, a lake in Yosemite National Park, California
Lake Vernon, a lake near Huntsville, Ontario

See also
Vernon Lake, a man-made lake in Vernon Parish, Louisiana
Vernon Lake (Idaho), a glacial lake in Boise County